The 2017 season of the 4. divisjon, the fifth highest association football league for men in Norway.

Between 22 and 26 games (depending on group size) were played in 24 groups, with 3 points given for wins and 1 for draws. Group winners were promoted to the 3. divisjon.

Teams 

Group 1
Selbak – promoted
Råde
Ås
Fredrikstad 2
Borgen
Tistedalen
Kråkerøy 2
Borgar
Rakkestad
Sparta Sarpsborg
Sarpsborg
Moss 2 – relegated
Kvik Halden 2 – relegated
Trosvik – relegated

Group 2
Grei – promoted
Holmlia
Lommedalen
Skeid 2
Bærum 2
Rommen
Lyn 2
Oppsal 2
Vollen
Vestli
Romsås
Røa

Group 3
Rilindja – promoted
Heming
Kjelsås 2
Fortuna Oslo
Årvoll
Follo 2
Ullern 2
Oslojuvelene
Majorstuen
Fremad Famagusta
Frigg 2
Hasle-Løren

Group 4
KFUM Oslo 2 – promoted
Nordstrand
Asker 2
Grorud 2
Kolbotn
Manglerud Star
Ski
Nesodden
Fagerborg
Gøy-Nor (changed name to Christiania)
Lille Tøyen – relegated
Oslo City

Group 5
Gjelleråsen – promoted
Kløfta
Aurskog-Høland
Raumnes & Årnes
Strømmen 2
Ull/Kisa IL 2
Skedsmo 2
Hauerseter
Blaker
Eidsvold Turn 2
Eidsvold
Fet
Lørenskog 2 – relegated
Gjerdrum – relegated

Group 6
Løten – promoted
Gran
Kolbukameratene
Faaberg
Follebu
Brumunddal 2
Toten
Gjøvik-Lyn 2
Ridabu
Snertingdal/Redalen 2 – relegated
Nordre Land
Fron – relegated

Group 7
Ottestad – promoted
Kongsvinger 2
Ham-Kam 2
Storhamar
Moelven
Engerdal
Sander
Trysil
MBK Domkirkeodden
Eidskog
Fart – relegated
Nybergsund 2 – pulled team

Group 8

Åssiden – promoted
Mjøndalen 2
Hallingdal
Modum
Strømsgodset 3 – relegated
Kongsberg
Solberg
Svelvik
Drammens BK
Steinberg
Hønefoss 2 – relegated
Jevnaker
Konnerud
Slemmestad

Group 9
Sandefjord 2 – promoted
Flint
Eik Tønsberg
Runar
Tønsberg FK
Husøy & Foynland
Larvik Turn
FK Tønsberg 2
Re
Nanset
Nesjar - pulled team
Skoppum - pulled team

Group 10
Urædd – promoted
Hei
Skarphedin
Tollnes
Pors 2
Herkules
FK Grenland – relegated
Notodden 2
Ulefoss
Stathelle og Omegn
Skade
Skotfoss – pulled team

Group 11
Donn – promoted
Lyngdal
Jerv 2
Vindbjart 2
Vigør
Mandalskameratene
Arendal 2
Søgne
Flekkefjord
Våg
Randesund
Hægebostad – relegated
Giv Akt – relegated
Gimletroll – relegated

Group 12
Egersund 2 – promoted
Randaberg
Klepp
Eiger
Hundvåg
Hinna
Sola 2
Midtbygden
Hana
Rosseland
Voll
Sunde – relegated
Buøy – relegated
Havørn – relegated

Group 13
Vardeneset – promoted
Åkra
Riska
Kopervik
Skjold
Frøyland
Ålgård
Djerv 1919
Nærbø
Vaulen
Varhaug
Vard 2 – relegated
Austrått – relegated
Avaldsnes – relegated

Group 14
Tertnes – promoted
Trott
NHH
Bjarg
Fyllingsdalen 2
Gneist
Vestsiden-Askøy
Lyngbø
Fana 2
Austevoll
Djerv – relegated
Bremnes – relegated

Group 15
Øystese – promoted
Arna-Bjørnar
Sund
Loddefjord
Ny-Krohnborg
Åsane 2
Sandviken
Odda
Nordhordland
Vadmyra – relegated
Voss – relegated
Nest-Sotra 2 – relegated

Group 16
Sogndal 2 – promoted
Stryn
Florø 2
Årdal
Eid
Vik
Dale
Tornado Måløy
Skavøypoll
Bremanger
Førde 2 – relegated
Høyang – relegated

Group 17
Hødd 2 – promoted
Bergsøy
Volda
Skarbøvik (changed name to SIF/Hessa)
Rollon
Emblem
Hareid
Godøy
Sykkylven
Larsnes/Gursken
Langevåg – relegated
Norborg – relegated

Group 18
Kristiansund 2 – promoted
Kristiansund FK
Sunndal
Surnadal
Tomrefjord
Averøykameratene
Eide og Omegn
Vestnes Varfjell
Træff 2
Frei – relegated
Elnesvågen og Omegn
Eidsvåg – relegated

Group 19
Levanger 2 – promoted
Kvik
Namsos
Trygg/Lade
NTNUI
Rørvik
Charlottenlund
Strindheim 2 – relegated
Vuku
Nardo 2
Vestbyen
Stjørdals-Blink 2

Group 20
Melhus – promoted
KIL/Hemne
Ranheim 2
Heimdal
Orkla 2
Kattem (merged with Heimdal post-season)
Tydal
Byåsen 2
Røros
Meldal
Alvdal – relegated
Buvik – relegated

Group 21
Stålkameratene – promoted
Bodø/Glimt 2
Fauske/Sprint
Sandnessjøen
Brønnøysund
Grand Bodø
Innstranden
Junkeren 2 – relegated
Mo 2 – relegated
Åga
Meløy – relegated
Saltdalkameratene – pulled team

Group 22
Melbo – promoted
Lofoten
Leknes
Grovfjord
Skånland
Stålbrott/Sortland 2
Morild
Medkila
Ballstad
Landsås
Høken – relegated
Harstad 2 (merged with Grovfjord post-season)

Group 23
Skarp – promoted
Lyngen/Karnes
Tromsø 3 – relegated
Tromsdalen 2
Nordkjosbotn
Krokelvdalen
Storelva
Stakkevollan
Finnsnes 2
Ishavsbyen
Senja 2 – relegated
Burfjord – relegated

Group 24
Bjørnevatn – promoted
Norild
Nordlys
Hammerfest (merged with HIF/Stein post-season)
Kirkenes
Tverrelvdalen
Sørøy Glimt
Porsanger
Honningsvåg
Bossekop
Kautokeino
Indrefjord

References
NIFS

5
Norway
Norway
Norwegian Fourth Division seasons